The Dominion Law Reports (DLR) is Canadian law report, first published in 1912. The report is published by Canada Law Book Ltd. It contains select reports of cases from both federal and provincial courts in all areas of law. Its early editors included W. J. Tremeaar and Robert Willes Chitty, the son of British jurist Thomas Willes Chitty, editor of Halsbury's.

References

Sources 

 
 
 

Law of Canada
Law books
1912 establishments in Ontario
Case law reporters of Canada